Eurasia International University (EIU) is a private and accredited institution of higher education, established in 1996 and headquartered in Yerevan.

History
Since 2004, EIU transitioned to the credit model which made the instruction fully compatible with the European Higher Education Area Standards and Bologna Agreement. EIU offers education at graduate and undergraduate levels in Law, Management, and Foreign Languages. EIU maintains various cooperation agreements with both regional and international universities. After successfully completing their studies, EIU students are awarded state diplomas by the Ministry of Education and Science. Following graduation, the university also grants diploma supplements, which correspond to the standards set forth by the European Commission, the Council of Europe and UNESCO-CEPES.

Mobility programs
Eurasia International University operates several exchange programs. The European Union offers scholarships in support of these. Some programs include:

 Warsaw University of Life Sciences
 Warsaw School of Economics
 Middle-East University in Turkey
 Masaryk University in Czech Republic
 Mykolas Romeris University in Vilnius
 Aristotle University of Thessaloniki
 Santiago de Compostela University in Spain
 University of Valencia in Spain
 Cyprus Technological University
 Alexander Technological Educational Institute of Thessaloniki in Greece
 Jagiellonian University in Poland
 University of Lodz in Poland

See also

 Education in Armenia
 List of universities in Armenia

References

External links
 

Science and technology in Armenia
Universities in Armenia
Educational institutions established in 1996
Education in Yerevan
1996 establishments in Armenia